Maxime Leroux (26 March 195121 January 2010) was a French actor.

Partial filmography

Les manèges de l'imaginaire (1982) - L'homme amnésique
Effraction (1983) - Un gangster
Le transfuge (1985)
Disorder (1986) - Propriétaire du magasin
Lévy et Goliath (1987) - Goliath
Cross (1987) - Sandro
Le moustachu (1987) - Richard Staub - le chef des terroristes
Agent trouble (1987) - Le docteur Arms
Beatrice (1987) - Richard / Knight
La maison de Jeanne (1988) - Marc
Chouans! (1988) - Le Prêtre réfractaire
Camille Claudel (1988) - Claude Debussy
Baxter (1989) - Baxter (voice)
Mama, There's A Man in Your Bed (1989) - Cloquet
Hiver 54, l'abbé Pierre (1989) - Le député Robert Buron
Mister Frost (1990) - Frank Larcher
Jean Galmot, aventurier (1990) - Antoine Charas
Milena (1991)
Netchaïev est de retour (1991) - Elie
Aujourd'hui peut-être... (1991) - Raphaël
La tribu (1991) - François
Terre rouge (1991) - Max
Dien Bien Phu (1992) - Artillery Lieutenant
Tango (1993) - Mariano Escobar
Un crime (1993) - Le concierge
Justinien Trouvé, ou le bâtard de Dieu (1993) - Le capitaine milicien
Faut-il aimer Mathilde? (1993) - Jacques
Son of the Shark (1993) - Le père
Montparnasse-Pondichéry (1994) - Felix
Colonel Chabert (1994) - Le clerc Godeschal
Excentric paradis (1996) - Raymond
La nave de los sueños (1996)
Fallait pas!... (1996) - Un spire
Corto Maltese: La cour secrète des Arcanes (2002) - Nino (voice)
Corto Maltese - Sous le signe du capricorne (2002)
Burnt Out (2005) - Inspecteur parisien
Un printemps à Paris (2006) - Denis
The Easy Way (2008) - '68'

References

External links
Maxime Leroux @ IMDb.com
Maxime Leroux; Aveleyman.com

1951 births
2010 deaths
French male film actors
French male stage actors
French male television actors
French male voice actors